Eddie: The Soundtrack is the soundtrack album to Steve Rash's 1996 film Eddie. It was released on May 21, 1996 through Hollywood Records/Island Black Music and consisted of contemporary R&B and hip hop. The album peaked at 119 on the Billboard 200 and 44 on the Top R&B/Hip-Hop Albums. Two singles made it to the charts, "Say It Again" which was a minor hit on the R&B charts and both the successful hits "Tell Me", and "It's All the Way Live (Now)".

Track listing

Notes
 signifies an additional producer
 signifies a co-producer
 signifies an executive producer

Charts

References

External links

Hip hop soundtracks
1996 soundtrack albums
Comedy film soundtracks
Island Records soundtracks
Albums produced by Fredwreck
Contemporary R&B soundtracks
Hollywood Records soundtracks
Albums produced by Chris Stokes (director)